Bob Gordon may refer to:

Bob Gordon (Canadian intelligence), former Canadian Security Intelligence Service agent
Bob Gordon (saxophonist) (1928–1955), cool jazz musician
Bob Gordon (rugby union) (1930–1995), Scotland international rugby union player
Bob Gordon (auto racer), father of Robby Gordon

See also
Robert Gordon (disambiguation)